Blackmill railway station served the village of Blackmill, in the historical county of Glamorgan County Council, Wales, from 1873 to 1961 on the Ogmore Valley line.

History 
The station was opened on 12 May 1873 by the Llynvi and Ogmore Railway. It was also known as Black Mill in Bradshaw until 1896. The service to  stopped on 22 September 1930 and the line, as well as the station, lost a lot of its traffic, thus the station closed to passengers on 5 May 1958 and closed to goods on 27 March 1961.

References

External links 

Railway stations in Great Britain opened in 1873
Railway stations in Great Britain closed in 1958
1873 establishments in Wales
1961 disestablishments in Wales